James "Jim" Hedges (born May 10, 1938) is an American politician who served as the Tax Assessor for Thompson Township, Pennsylvania and as the Prohibition Party's 2016 presidential nominee. He is currently the only member of the Prohibition Party to be elected to public office in the 21st century, and the first since 1959.

Life

James Hedges was born on May 10, 1938, in Iowa City, Iowa to Robert Hedges and Margaret Ayres, who were teetotallers for religious reasons. He became interested in the Prohibition Party while in high school after reading an article in a newspaper.

Hedges earned a Bachelor of Arts in Musical Performance from the University of Iowa in 1960, then enlisted in the United States Marine Band, in Washington, D.C., where he played tuba for twenty years. In 1972, he earned a Master’s degree in Geography from the University of Maryland and published widely on karst and on periglacial geomorphology.

From 1972 to 1983, Hedges served as the editor of the National Speleological Society Bulletin. He later became a reporter and environmental columnist for area weekly newspapers and was appointed Fulton County’s first Recycling Coordinator.

In 1980, Hedges retired from the military and became more active in the Prohibition Party and rose to the position of Executive Secretary in 2003. In 2005, he was selected as the Secretary of the Partisan Prohibition Historical Society. Hedges also publishes the party's printed newsletter.

Tax assessor

In 2001, Hedges secured the nominations of the Republican, Democratic and Prohibition parties through write-in ballots to appear as the only candidate for Tax Assessor in Thompson Township. He won the election, and was sworn-in in 2002 by District Justice Carol Jean Johnson. He became the first official elected in a partisan election from the Prohibition Party since two members of the Winona Lake, Indiana, city council were elected in 1959. Hedges was re-elected in 2005, and served until the office was abolished by the Pennsylvania General Assembly in 2007.

2004 presidential election

Prior to the 2004 presidential election, Hedges was involved in a schism within the party stemming from alleged misuse of funds and mismanagement by Earl Dodge, the party's long-time face. Notably, Hedges and others claimed that Dodge sold the party's headquarters for $119,500 in 1999 with intent to build on his own property, but that Dodge instead kept the money for himself and moved the headquarters to a tool shed. Dodge countered by saying that he placed the funds in a separate party account, and argued that Hedges and others who had put forth the allegations were simply disgruntled with their position in the party. Nevertheless, Hedges and his faction formed the Concerns of the People (Prohibition) Party to counter Dodge, and nominated Washington anti-alcohol activist and preacher Gene Amondson for President. Both Dodge and Hedges claimed their parties were the authentic Prohibition Party. The split abruptly came to an end in 2007 after Dodge's death, and the reunified party again nominated Amondson for president for the 2008 election.

2012 presidential campaign

After Gene Amondson's death in 2009, a vacancy opened for the Prohibition Party's 2012 presidential nomination. Hedges announced on February 18, 2010, that he intended to run for the nomination. In preparation, he established a campaign website, sent out a series of postcards through the party's mailing list and contacted members of the nominating committee. Despite such efforts, Hedges lost the nomination to retired engineer Jack Fellure at the Cullman, Alabama Prohibition Party National Convention on June 22, 2011.

2016 presidential campaign

In the 2016 presidential election cycle, Hedges was initially the preferred running mate of Greg Seltzer, the Prohibition Party's Chairman, who was seeking the party's presidential nomination. In April 2015, Seltzer withdrew his candidacy and resigned as the party's Chairman upon being appointed by Maryland Governor Larry Hogan to the Maryland Elections Board. Following Seltzer's departure from the race, Hedges became a candidate for the party's presidential nomination.
     
Hedges received the Prohibition presidential nomination during a nominating convention held via conference call on July 31, 2015. Hedges was a contestant in the American Independent Party Party primary in California where received 10.56% and carried Lake County. The Prohibition Party's ballot access was increased from Fellure's in 2012 and attempts were made in other states, but in Tennessee two electors dropped out shortly before the filing deadline and floods in Louisiana prevented ballot petitioning in the state.

In the general election Hedges appeared on the ballot in Arkansas, Colorado, and Mississippi and received 5,617 votes, the best showing for a Prohibition nominee since Earl Dodge received 8,002 votes in 1988, and placed third in Arkansas County, Arkansas. Following the election, he was selected as the party's secretary.

Electoral history

References

External links
Campaign website

1938 births
21st-century tubists
Living people
American tubists
United States military musicians
Pennsylvania local politicians
Pennsylvania Prohibitionists
People from Fulton County, Pennsylvania
People from Iowa City, Iowa
Military personnel from Iowa
Candidates in the 2012 United States presidential election
21st-century American politicians
Candidates in the 2016 United States presidential election
University of Iowa alumni
University of Maryland, College Park alumni
Prohibition Party (United States) presidential nominees